Desmodium uncinatum, the silverleaf desmodium, is a species of flowering plant in the family Fabaceae, native to Latin America, and introduced as a fodder to various locales in Africa, India, New Guinea, Australia and Hawaii. Although chiefly a fodder, it can also be used for pasture, deferred feed, cut-and-carry, hay, ground cover, and mulch. It is considered invasive in Australia and Hawaii.

This species of Desmodium has also found use in the push-pull technology for pest management where it is grown as an intercrop between rows of a cereal crop to control stem-boring insects and fall armyworms. Together with D. intortum (greenleaf desmodium) they are the most common two intercrops of push-pull technology.

References

uncinatum
Fodder
Flora of Mexico
Flora of Central America
Flora of Venezuela
Flora of the Galápagos Islands
Flora of western South America
Flora of Brazil
Flora of Northeast Argentina
Flora of Northwest Argentina
Flora of Paraguay
Flora of Uruguay
Plants described in 1825